Otter Crest State Scenic Viewpoint is a state park in the U.S. state of Oregon, administered by the Oregon Parks and Recreation Department.  Going north on State Highway 101 the turnoff to the left comes up quickly and is easy to miss in the dense foliage.  Taking it ones gets a view of Cape Foulweather.

See also

 List of Oregon state parks

References

External links
 

State parks of Oregon
Parks in Lincoln County, Oregon